Mandilhon Leotaud (2 May 1871 – 21 February 1935) was a Trinidadian cricketer. He played in four first-class matches for Trinidad and Tobago from 1891 to 1895.

See also
 List of Trinidadian representative cricketers

References

External links
 

1871 births
1935 deaths
Trinidad and Tobago cricketers